Al posto tuo is a 2016 Italian comedy film written by Massimo di Nicola and directed by Max Croci and starring  Luca Argentero, Ambra Angiolini and Angela Melillo.

Plot

Luca Molteni and Rocco Fontana are two creative directors of a company that produces plumbing fixtures, where the first is a single architect by choice, sexy, who lives in a town, while the other is an architect who lives in a country house, married to Claudia and with three children. When they discover the companies they work want to fusion, their German sadic director proposes to them, to win the only position of manager in the new society, a "life exchange": for a week they will have to exchange their homes and adopt the same daily habits of the other.

Cast 
 Luca Argentero: as Luca Molteni
 : as Rocco Fontana
 Ambra Angiolini: as Claudia
 Serena Rossi: as Anna
 : as Ines
 : as Erminia
 : as Artois
 Carolina Poccioni: as Alice
 : as Salvo
 Giulietta Rebeggiani: as Sarah
 Gualtiero Burzi: as Bellatreccia
 Pia Lanciotti: as Mrs Welter
 Giulia Greco: as Mara
 Nicola Stravalaci: as Rosario
 Haruhiko Yamanouchi: as  Dr. Shimura
 Roberta Mengozzi: as Interprete
 Angela Melillo: as Alba
 Riccardo Mandolini: as Salvo

See also 
 List of Italian films of 2016

References

External links

2016 comedy films
Italian comedy films
2010s Italian films